

Australia
 Christmas Island
Administrator –
 F. C. Boyle, Administrator of Christmas Island (1977–1980)
 Rendle McNeilage Holten, Administrator of Christmas Island (1980–1982)
 Cocos (Keeling) Islands
Administrator – Charles Ivens Buffett, Administrator of Cocos (Keeling) Islands (1977–1981)
Council Chairman – Parson bin Yapat, Chairman of the Cocos Islands Council (1979–1981)
 Norfolk Island
 Administrator – Peter Coleman, Administrator of Norfolk Island (1979–1981)
 Chief Minister – David Buffett, Chief Minister of Norfolk Island (1979–1986)

Denmark
 Faroe Islands
High Commissioner – Leif Groth, High Commissioner in the Faroe Islands (1972–1981)
 Prime Minister – Atli Dam, Prime Minister of the Faroe Islands (1970–1981)
 Greenland
High Commissioner – Torben Hede Pedersen, High Commissioner in Greenland (1979–1992)
 Prime Minister – Jonathan Motzfeldt, Prime Minister of Greenland (1979–1991)

France
French Polynesia
 High Commissioner – Paul Cousseran, High Commissioner of the Republic in French Polynesia (1977–1981)
 Mayotte
 Prefect –
 Jean Rigotard, Prefect of Mayotte (1978–1980)
 Philippe Jacques Nicolas Kessler, Prefect of Mayotte (1980–1981)
 President of the General Council – Younoussa Bamana, President of the General Council of Mayotte (1976–1991)
 New Caledonia
 High Commissioner – Claude Charbonniaud, High Commissioner of New Caledonia (1978–1981)
 New Hebrides  – condominium together with the United Kingdom
gained independence as Vanuatu on 30 July 1980
British Resident Commissioner – Andrew Stuart (1978–1980)
French Resident Commissioner – Jean-Jacques Robert (1978–1980)
Chief Minister – Walter Lini, Chief Minister of New Hebrides (1979–1991)
 Saint Pierre and Miquelon
 Prefect – Clément Bouhin, Prefect of Saint Pierre and Miquelon (1979–1981)
 President of the General Council – Albert Pen, President of the General Council of Saint Pierre and Miquelon (1968–1984)
 Wallis and Futuna
 Administrator-Superior –
 Pierre Isaac, Administrator Superior of Wallis and Futuna (1979–1980)
 Robert Thil, Administrator Superior of Wallis and Futuna (1980–1983)
 President of the Territorial Assembly – Manuele Lisiahi, President of the Territorial Assembly of Wallis and Futuna (1978–1984)

New Zealand
 Cook Islands
 Queen's Representative – Sir Gaven Donne, Queen's Representative of the Cook Islands (1975–1984)
 Prime Minister – Tom Davis, Prime Minister of the Cook Islands (1978–1983)
 Niue
 Premier – Robert Rex, Premier of Niue (1974–1992)
 Tokelau
 Administrator – Frank Corner, Administrator of Tokelau (1975–1984)

Portugal
 Macau
 Governor – Melo Egídio, Governor of Macau (1979–1981)

South Africa
 South West Africa
Administrator-General –
 Gerrit Viljoen, Administrator-General of South West Africa (1979–1980)
 Danie Hough, Administrator-General of South West Africa (1980–1983)
Premier – Dirk Mudge, Chairman of the Council of Ministers of South West Africa (1980–1983)

United Kingdom / British Crown
 Anguilla
seceded from Saint Christopher and Nevis on 19 December 1980
 Governor – Charles Harry Godden, Governor of Anguilla (1978–1983)
 Chief Minister –
 Emile Gumbs, Chief Minister of Anguilla (1977–1980)
 Ronald Webster, Chief Minister of Anguilla (1980–1984)
 Antigua
Governor – Sir Wilfred Jacobs, Governor of Antigua (1967–1993)
Premier – Vere Bird, Premier of Antigua (1976–1994)
 Belize
Governor –
 Peter Donovan McEntee, Governor of Belize (1976–1980)
 Sir James Patrick Ivan Hennessy, Governor of Belize (1980–1981)
Premier – George Cadle Price, Premier of Belize (1961–1984)
 Bermuda
 Governor –
 Sir Peter Ramsbotham, Governor of Bermuda (1977–1980)
 Sir Richard Posnett, Governor of Bermuda (1980–1983)
 Premier – David Gibbons, Premier of Bermuda (1977–1982)
 British Virgin Islands
 Governor – James Alfred Davidson, Governor of the British Virgin Islands (1978–1982)
 Chief Minister – Lavity Stoutt, Chief Minister of the British Virgin Islands (1979–1983)
 Brunei
High Commissioner – Arthur Christopher Watson, British High Commissioner in Brunei (1978–1984)
Sultan – Hassanal Bolkiah, Sultan of Brunei (1967–present)
Chief Minister – Pengiran Dipa Negara Laila Diraja Pengiran Abdul Mumin, Chief Minister of Brunei (1972–1981)
 Cayman Islands
 Governor – Thomas Russell, Governor of the Cayman Islands (1974–1982)
 Falkland Islands
 Governor –
 Sir James Roland Walter Parker, Governor of the Falkland Islands (1977–1980)
 Rex Hunt, Governor of the Falkland Islands (1980–1982)
 Gibraltar
 Governor – Sir William Jackson, Governor of Gibraltar (1978–1982)
 Chief Minister – Sir Joshua Hassan, Chief Minister of Gibraltar (1972–1987)
 Guernsey
 Lieutenant-Governor –
 Sir John Edward Ludgate Martin, Lieutenant-Governor of Guernsey (1974–1980)
 Sir Peter Le Cheminant, Lieutenant-Governor of Guernsey (1980–1985)
 Bailiff – Sir John Loveridge, Bailiff of Guernsey (1973–1982)
 Hong Kong
 Governor – Sir Murray MacLehose, Governor of Hong Kong (1971–1982)
 Isle of Man
 Lieutenant-Governor –
 Sir John Warburton Paul, Lieutenant-Governor of Man (1974–1980)
 Sir Nigel Cecil, Lieutenant-Governor of Man (1980–1985)
 Head of Government – Clifford Irving, Chairman of the Executive Council of the Isle of Man (1977–1981)
 Jersey
 Lieutenant-Governor – Sir Peter Whiteley, Lieutenant-Governor of Jersey (1979–1985)
 Bailiff – Sir Frank Ereaut, Bailiff of Jersey (1975–1985)
 Montserrat
 Governor –
 Gwilyum Wyn Jones, Governor of Montserrat (1977–1980)
 David Kenneth Hay Dale, Governor of Montserrat (1980–1984)
 Chief Minister – John Osborne, Chief Minister of Montserrat (1978–1991)
 New Hebrides – condominium together with France
gained independence as Vanuatu on 30 July 1980
British Resident Commissioner – Andrew Stuart (1978–1980)
French Resident Commissioner – Jean-Jacques Robert (1978–1980)
Chief Minister – Walter Lini, Chief Minister of New Hebrides (1979–1991)
 Pitcairn Islands
 Governor –
 Sir Harold Smedley, Governor of the Pitcairn Islands (1976–1980)
 Sir Richard Stratton, Governor of the Pitcairn Islands (1980–1984)
 Magistrate – Ivan Christian, Magistrate of the Pitcairn Islands (1975–1984)
 Saint Christopher and Nevis
 Governor – Sir Probyn Ellsworth-Innis, Governor of Saint Christopher and Nevis (1975–1981)
 Premier –
 Lee Moore, Premier of Saint Christopher and Nevis (1979–1980)
 Kennedy Simmonds, Premier of Saint Christopher and Nevis (1980–1995)
 Saint Helena and Dependencies
 Governor – Geoffrey Colin Guy, Governor of Saint Helena (1976–1981)
Southern Rhodesia
gained independence as Zimbabwe on 18 April 1980
Governor – Christopher Soames, Baron Soames, Governor of Southern Rhodesia (1979–1980)
 Turks and Caicos Islands
 Governor – John Clifford Strong, Governor of the Turks and Caicos Islands (1978–1982)
 Chief Minister  –
 James Alexander George Smith McCartney, Chief Minister of Turks and Caicos Islands (1976–1980)
 Oswald Skippings, Chief Minister of Turks and Caicos Islands (1980)
 Norman Saunders, Chief Minister of Turks and Caicos Islands (1980–1985)

United States
 American Samoa
Governor – Peter Tali Coleman, Governor of American Samoa (1978–1985)
 Guam
 Governor – Paul McDonald Calvo, Governor of Guam (1979–1983)
 Puerto Rico
 Governor – Carlos Romero Barceló, Governor of Puerto Rico (1977–1985)
 Trust Territory of the Pacific Islands
 High Commissioner – Adrian P. Winkel, High Commissioner of the Trust Territory of the Pacific Islands (1977–1981)
Northern Mariana Islands (autonomous territory)
 Governor – Carlos S. Camacho, Governor of the Northern Mariana Islands (1978–1982)
Marshall Islands (autonomous territory)
President – Amata Kabua, President of the Marshall Islands (1979–1996)
Federated States of Micronesia (autonomous territory)
President – Tosiwo Nakayama, President of the Federated States of Micronesia (1979–1987)
 United States Virgin Islands
 Governor – Juan Francisco Luis, Governor of US Virgin Islands (1978–1987)

Colonial governors
Colonial governors
1980